The 2006 IPC Athletics World Championships was held in Assen, Netherlands from 2–9 September 2006. It was the fourth edition of the international athletics competition for athletes with a disability organised by the International Paralympic Committee (IPC).

The main venue for the competition was Sports Park Stadsbroek, with the marathon events taking place in the surrounding area. The opening and closing ceremonies took place at De Smelt Stadium. Princess Margriet of the Netherlands was present for the opening of the championships. A total of 76 nations and 1097 athletes took part in the events.

Over the course of the nine-day competition 51 IPC world records were broken. Among these were sprint records by visually impaired runner Jason Smyth and amputee sportsman Oscar Pistorius. China was the top performing nation, with 22 gold medals among its haul of 55 medals. The United States and Australia were the next best nations, with each securing 16 golds and 32 medals in total. Among the participating nations, 58 reached the medal table.

The IPC launched its own internet streaming service at paralympicsport.tv, which broadcast live events from the competition. The local organising committee was headed by the Euro Champ Foundation, a civil society group promoting disability sports.

Medals
 :de:Leichtathletik-Weltmeisterschaften der Behinderten 2006/Medaillenspiegel - 2006 Medals

References

External links

Official report at WorldCat
Paralympic results database

World Para Athletics Championships
IPC Athletics World Championships
IPC Athletics World Championships
International athletics competitions hosted by the Netherlands
Sports competitions in Assen